In Ohio, State Route 271 may refer to:
Interstate 271 in Ohio, the only Ohio highway numbered 271 since about 1962
Ohio State Route 271 (1930), now US 20A north of Montpelier
Ohio State Route 271 (1930s-1960s), now SR 541